The 1999 European Parliament election in Italy was the election of the delegation from Italy to the European Parliament in 1999.

Electoral system
The pure party-list proportional representation was the traditional electoral system of the Italian Republic since its foundation in 1946, so it had been adopted to elect the Italian representatives to the European Parliament too. Two levels were used: a national level to divide seats between parties, and a constituency level to distribute them between candidates. Italian regions were united in 5 constituencies, each electing a group of deputies. At national level, seats were divided between party lists using the largest remainder method with Hare quota. All seats gained by each party were automatically distributed to their local open lists and their most voted candidates.

Main parties and leaders

Outgoing MEPs

Summary of parties

Results
The election was won again by Forza Italia, just accepted to the European People's Party, that got 25.2% of the vote and 22 seats. The governing Democrats of the Left, led by Walter Veltroni, got 17.3% of the vote and 15 seats, while National Alliance, federated to Segni Pact, got only 10.3% of the vote and 9 seats (8 seats to AN and one seat to Segni Pact). Instead a good result was obtained by Bonino List, that gained 8.5% of the vote and 7 seats.

References

Italy
European Parliament elections in Italy
1999 elections in Italy